Tappeh (also known as Tepe) is a village in Gel-e Sefid Rural District, in the Central District of Langarud County, Gilan Province, Iran. At the 2006 census, its population was 392, in 117 families.

References 

Populated places in Langarud County